KHCF is a class A radio station broadcasting out of Morgan Hill, California

History
KHCF began broadcasting on December 16, 2010.

References

External links
 

Morgan Hill, California
Radio stations established in 2013
HCF
2013 establishments in California